Shaun Russell Ellis-Bradley (born April 8, 1997) is an American football linebacker for the Philadelphia Eagles of the National Football League (NFL). He played college football at Temple and was drafted by the Eagles in the sixth round of the 2020 NFL Draft.

Raised in Mount Holly, New Jersey, he played prep football, in addition to competing in basketball and track, as a student at Rancocas Valley Regional High School.

College career
While mulling offers from Delaware, Rhode Island and others, Bradley committed to Temple too late to be on scholarship, leading him to grayshirt the 2015 season, attending classes at Rowan College at Burlington County before being a part of Temple's 2016 signing class.

Professional career

Bradley was drafted by the Philadelphia Eagles in the sixth round with the 196th overall pick of the 2020 NFL Draft. On January 1, 2021, Bradley was placed on injured reserve.

On December 25, 2021, Bradley was placed on the COVID list. He was activated on December 30. 

In 2022, the Eagles made Super Bowl LVII without Bradley. But the Eagles lost 38-35 to the Kansas City Chiefs.

References

1997 births
Living people
People from Mount Holly, New Jersey
People from Westampton Township, New Jersey
Rancocas Valley Regional High School alumni
Sportspeople from Burlington County, New Jersey
American football linebackers
Temple Owls football players
Philadelphia Eagles players
Players of American football from New Jersey